The 2022–23 Chicago Blackhawks season is the 97th season for the National Hockey League franchise that was established on September 25, 1926. The Blackhawks are led by first-year head coach Luke Richardson.

On March 18, the Blackhawks were eliminated from playoff contention after a 4–2 loss to the Arizona Coyotes.

Standings

Divisional standings

Conference standings

Schedule and results

Preseason
The preseason schedule was published on August 3, 2022.

Regular season
The regular season schedule was published on July 6, 2022.

Player statistics

Skaters

Goaltenders

†Denotes player spent time with another team before joining the Blackhawks. Stats reflect time with the Blackhawks only.
‡Denotes player was traded mid-season. Stats reflect time with the Blackhawks only.
Bold/italics denotes franchise record.

Roster

Transactions
The Blackhawks have been involved in the following transactions during the 2022–23 season.

Key:

 Contract is entry-level.
 Contract initially takes effect in the 2023-24 season.

Trades

Notes:
 Chicago retains 50% of McCabe's remaining contract
 Chicago retains 50% of Kane's remaining contract

Players acquired

Players lost

Signings

Draft picks

Below are the Chicago Blackhawks' selections at the 2022 NHL Entry Draft, which was held on July 7 to 8, 2022, at Bell Centre in Montreal.

References

Chicago Blackhawks seasons
Chicago Blackhawks
Chicago Blackhawks
Chicago Blackhawks